Haridian Rodríguez Hernández (born 31 July 1986) is a Spanish female handball player  for Club Balonmano Porriño and the Spanish national team.

Achievements 
División de Honor: 2016/17

Copa de la Reina: 2015

Supercopa de España: 2017

References

1986 births
Living people
Spanish female handball players
Sportspeople from Las Palmas
Competitors at the 2013 Mediterranean Games
Mediterranean Games competitors for Spain